White Bush, alternately spelled Whitebush, is one of Berkeley County, West Virginia's oldest brick mansions. The area at that time was part of Frederick County, Virginia. The property was formerly owned by Lord Fairfax, Thomas Fairfax, 6th Lord Fairfax of Cameron but was confiscated as British property during the American Revolutionary War. A grist and saw mill had been established on the riverfront not far from the mansion by 1785.

The mansion is a rare combination of Federal architecture in the main mansion, and a later Victorian style addition.

White Bush was accepted into the National Register of Historic Places on December 10, 1980.  It is alternately listed as the Archibald Shearer House.  It is also listed in the Berkeley County Historical Society and the Berkeley County Historical Landmarks Commission Survey.

References

Houses on the National Register of Historic Places in West Virginia
Georgian architecture in West Virginia
Federal architecture in West Virginia
Victorian architecture in West Virginia
Houses completed in 1790
Houses in Berkeley County, West Virginia
National Register of Historic Places in Berkeley County, West Virginia